Maqsood Ahmad (born 25 December 1976) is a Pakistani sprinter. He competed in the 2000 Summer Olympics.

References

1976 births
Living people
Athletes (track and field) at the 2000 Summer Olympics
Pakistani male sprinters
Olympic athletes of Pakistan